OTO Award TV Sports Commentator

Currently held by  Marcel Merčiak

First awarded  | Last awarded 2001 | Present  

OTO Award for TV Sports Commentator has been awarded since the second edition of the accolades, established by Art Production Agency (APA) in Slovakia in 2000. Each year, the award has been presented to the most recognized television sportcasters of the past year with the ceremony permitted live by the national television network STV.

Winners and nominees

2000s

2010s

Superlatives

Notes
┼ Denotes also a winner in two or more of the main categories. † Denotes also a winner of the Absolute OTO category. Ž Denotes also a winner of the Život Award.

References

External links
 OTO Awards (Official website)
 OTO Awards - Winners and nominees (From 2000 onwards)
 OTO Awards - Winners and nominees (From 2000 to 2009)

OTO Awards
Slovak culture
Slovak television awards
Awards established in 2000